"Atada a Tu Volcán" ("Tied to Your Volcano") is a song written by Frank Ceaera and performed by Puerto Rican singer Ednita Nazario on her album Espíritu Libre (1996). It became her third number-one song on the Billboard Latin Pop Airplay chart in 1996. Ceaera was awarded at the 1997 American Society of Composers, Authors and Publishers in the Pop/Rock category for the song. A music video was filmed for the song.

Charts

Weekly charts

Year-end charts

See also
List of number-one Billboard Latin Pop Airplay songs of 1996

References

1996 songs
1996 singles
Ednita Nazario songs
1990s ballads
Pop ballads
Spanish-language songs
Song recordings produced by K. C. Porter